Kidder Mountain is a  summit located in south-central New Hampshire within the Wapack Range of mountains. It lies within New Ipswich and Temple, New Hampshire just off the  Wapack Trail on a  side trail. Temple Mountain is located directly to the north along the Wapack ridgeline; Barrett Mountain to the south. The summit of the mountain is mostly open and offers expansive views from old pastures.

The east side of the mountain drains into the Souhegan River watershed, thence into the Merrimack River and Atlantic Ocean; the west side drains into the Gridley River, thence the Contoocook River into the Merrimack River.

The mountain is named in honor of Reuben Kidder, a provincial squire from New Ipswich who represented the local Masonian Proprietors.

References

 Southern New Hampshire Trail Guide (1999). Boston: The Appalachian Mountain Club.

External links
 Friends of the Wapack

Mountains of Hillsborough County, New Hampshire
Mountains of New Hampshire
Temple, New Hampshire
New Ipswich, New Hampshire